Latignano is a village in Tuscany, central Italy, administratively a frazione of the comune of Cascina, province of Pisa. At the time of the 2001 census its population was 556.

Latignano is about 18 km from Pisa and 4 km from Cascina.

References 

Frazioni of the Province of Pisa